Sally Bishop is a 1924 British silent romance film directed by Maurice Elvey and starring Marie Doro, Henry Ainley and Florence Turner. It is an adaptation of the novel Sally Bishop, a Romance by E. Temple Thurston.

Cast
 Marie Doro - Sally Bishop 
 Henry Ainley - John Traill 
 Florence Turner - Janet 
 Sydney Fairbrother - Landlady 
 Valia - Miss Standish Rowe 
 A. Bromley Davenport - Landlord 
 Mary Dibley - Miss Priestly 
 May Hanbury - Mrs Durlacher 
 Stella St. Audrie - Mrs Bishop 
 Humberston Wright - Judge 
 Dallas Cairns - Mr Durlacher 
 George Turner - Arthur

References

External links

1924 films
British silent feature films
1920s English-language films
Films directed by Maurice Elvey
1924 romantic drama films
British romantic drama films
Stoll Pictures films
British black-and-white films
1920s British films
Silent romantic drama films